Jacob Krebs (March 13, 1782 – September 26, 1847) was an American politician who served as a Jacksonian member of the U.S. House of Representatives for Pennsylvania's 7th congressional district from 1826 to 1827.

Jacob Krebs was born in Longswamp Township, Berks County, Pennsylvania to Michael and Catherine Kunz Krebs. As a young man he came to Schuylkill Haven, Schuylkill County, Pennsylvania and purchased a large tract of land, part of which became the county farm (known today as Rest Haven). He devoted his time to developing this property "and became very wealthy for a man of his time. He stood as one of the most prominent and widely known and influential men of his time." He was married to Elizabeth Bayer/Boyer. 

As a politician he served as a republican member of the Pennsylvania House of Representatives from 1812 to 1814.  He was elected as a Jacksonian democrat to the Nineteenth U.S. Congress to fill the vacancy caused by the death of Henry Wilson and served from December 4, 1826 to March 3, 1827 (however he was not a candidate for renomination). He was a democrat member of the Pennsylvania State Senate for the 6th district from 1828 to 1836. He was also elected Register of Wills, Clerk of Courts and Recorder for Schuylkill County (a combined office at the time) and served from 1840 to 1842. After each term of office ended he then resumed his previous occupation in the agricultural business.  He died in Orwigsburg, Schuylkill County, Pennsylvania in 1847.  Interment in St. Paul's Evangelical Lutheran Cemetery in Orwigsburg.

Sources

The Political Graveyard

|-

1782 births
1847 deaths
Pennsylvania state senators
Jacksonian members of the United States House of Representatives from Pennsylvania
19th-century American politicians